Annales. Histoire, Sciences Sociales is a French academic journal covering social history that was established in 1929 by Marc Bloch and Lucien Febvre. The journal gave rise to an approach to history known as the Annales School. The journal began in Strasbourg as Annales d'histoire économique et sociale; it moved to Paris and kept the same name from 1929 to 1939. It was successively renamed Annales d'histoire sociale (1939–1942, 1945), Mélanges d'histoire sociale (1942–1944), Annales. Economies, sociétés, civilisations (1946–1994), and, finally, Annales. Histoire, Sciences Sociales in 1994. In 2013 it began publication of an English language edition, with all the articles translated.

The scope of topics covered by the journal is wide, but the emphasis is on social history and long-term trends (longue durée), often using quantification and paying special attention to geography and to the intellectual world view of common people, or "mentality" (mentalité). Less attention is paid to political, diplomatic, or military history, or to biographies of famous men. Instead, the Annales focused attention on the synthesizing of historical patterns identified from social, economic, and cultural history, statistics, medical reports, family studies, and even psychoanalysis. It is one of the main French outlets for research in historical anthropology.

In 2017 the EHESS formed a partnership with Cambridge University Press to publish both the French and English editions of the Annales. The English-language edition was published from 2012 until 2018, carrying English translations of the original French articles. However, no English translation has been carried out since March 2018.

Annales. Histoire, Sciences Sociales has no official impact factor.

See also 
 World-systems theory

References

External links 
 
 Éditions de l'EHESS
 Free access to all issues of the Annales from 1929 to 2002.
 Jstor
 Current content of the Annales

Bimonthly journals
French-language journals
History journals
Sociology journals
Publications established in 1929
Academic journals published in France
Cambridge University Press academic journals